County Road 502 or County Route 502 may refer to:

County Route 502 (California)
County Road 502 (Brevard County, Florida)
County Route 502 (New Jersey)